Alexa Martín-Moreno artistically known as Alexa Martín is a Mexican television actress; best known for her role of Leticia Bethancourt in the Mexican version of the Colombian series Rosario Tijeras. Her first leading role was in the TV Azteca drama series Tres Milagros, a Mexican adaptation of the Colombian series of the same name. She is a graduate from the TV Azteca art training center  (CEFAT) in 2015.

Personal life 
She is married with the actor Erick Chapa, the wedding ceremony was held on 3 February 2017 at Hacienda La Escoba, in Jalisco. They both became parents on 25 October 2019, when their first child, whom they called Lorenzo, was born.

Filmography

References

External links 
 

Living people
Mexican television actresses
21st-century Mexican actresses
Year of birth missing (living people)